Matthieu Guerbert (born 17 June 1987) is a French professional footballer who plays as midfielder for Championnat National 2 club Colomiers.

Club career
Guerbert is a youth product of Rodez, and returned to them in 2013 after a couple of years in non-professional leagues. He made his professional debut with Rodez in a 2–0 Ligue 2 win over Auxerre on 26 July 2019.

In July 2020, Guerbert left Rodez and signed for Gazélec Ajaccio.

Personal life
Guerbert is the younger brother of the footballer Thomas Guerbert.

References

External links
 
 
 
 Foot-National Profile

1987 births
Living people
People from Meaux
Association football midfielders
French footballers
Toulouse Fontaines Club players
Rodez AF players
Dijon FCO players
Balma SC players
Gazélec Ajaccio players
US Colomiers Football players
Ligue 2 players
Championnat National players
Championnat National 2 players
Championnat National 3 players